Kalmar nation, is one of the thirteen student nations (student society) at Uppsala university in Sweden. It is named for the city of Kalmar.

Kalmar nation was founded in 1663 when the old Smålands nation split into two; Kalmar representing eastern Småland and the island of Öland, and Wexiö nation representing the west of Småland.

Kalmar nation currently has around 1,700 members and is considered a somewhat 'alternative' nation, focusing on live music, providing for vegetarian and vegan diets, and regularly hosting a night clubs.

Inspektors 
 Kalmar nation

Nations at Uppsala University
Student organizations established in the 17th century
1663 establishments in Sweden